Route 94 serves eastern and central Missouri.  The entire route closely parallels the Missouri River.  The eastern terminus is at U.S. Route 67 in West Alton; its western terminus is at the intersection of U.S. Route 54 and U.S. Route 63 in Jefferson City.

Route 94 was one of the original 1922 highways, but its western terminus was in St. Charles at Route 2 (now U.S. Route 40) and Route 9 (now U.S. Route 61). US 40/61 are now part of Interstate 64, an important freeway in the area.

This highway joins with Route 364 for a short distance in St. Charles County. In addition, Route 94 joins with Route 47 for a short distance in Warren County. Route 94 makes up one side of the Golden Triangle in St. Charles County.
In 2006 the north part of 94 towards West Alton was under heavy re-construction to widen both lanes to make it safer for traffic.

Major intersections

See also

 List of state highways in Missouri

References

External links

094
Transportation in Callaway County, Missouri
Transportation in Montgomery County, Missouri
Transportation in Warren County, Missouri
Transportation in St. Charles County, Missouri